The Pulitzer Prizes for 2005 were announced on 2005-04-04.

Journalism
Beat reporting: Amy Dockser Marcus of The Wall Street Journal for her "stories about patients, families and physicians [of the] world of cancer survivors".
Breaking news photography: Associated Press staff Murad Sezer, Khalid Mohammed
Breaking news reporting: Staff of The Star-Ledger, Newark, New Jersey, for "coverage of the resignation of New Jersey's governor after he announced he was gay and confessed to adultery with a male lover".
Commentary: Connie Schultz of The Plain Dealer, Cleveland
Criticism: Joe Morgenstern of The Wall Street Journal
Explanatory reporting: Gareth Cook of The Boston Globe for explaining "the complex scientific and ethical dimensions of stem cell research".
Editorial cartooning: Nick Anderson of The Courier-Journal, Louisville, Ky.
Editorial writing: Tom Philp of The Sacramento Bee
Feature photography: Deanne Fitzmaurice of the San Francisco Chronicle
Feature writing: Julia Keller of the Chicago Tribune for her "account of a deadly 10-second tornado that ripped through Utica, Illinois".
International reporting: 
Kim Murphy of the Los Angeles Times for her "coverage of Russia's struggle to cope with terrorism, improve the economy and make democracy work".
Dele Olojede of Newsday, Long Island, New York, for his look at Rwanda 10 years after the Rwandan genocide.
Investigative reporting: Nigel Jaquiss of Willamette Week, Portland, Oregon, "for his investigation exposing a former governor's long concealed sexual misconduct with a 14-year-old girl".
National reporting: Walt Bogdanich of The New York Times for his "stories about the corporate cover-up of responsibility for fatal accidents at railway crossings".
Public service: Los Angeles Times, for "exposing deadly medical problems and racial injustice at a major public hospital".

Letters and drama
Biography or autobiography
de Kooning: An American Master by Mark Stevens and Annalyn Swan (Alfred A. Knopf)
Drama
Doubt, a parable by John Patrick Shanley (TCG)
Fiction
Gilead by Marilynne Robinson (Farrar)
General non-fiction
Ghost Wars by Steve Coll (The Penguin Press)
History
Washington's Crossing by David Hackett Fischer (Oxford University Press)
Music
Second Concerto for Orchestra by Steven Stucky (Theodore Presser Company)
Poetry
Delights & Shadows by Ted Kooser (Copper Canyon Press)

References

External links
 
 "Pulitzer Prizes Announced". The New York Times.
 "Pulitzer Prizes for Journalism". The New York Times.
 "Pulitzer Prizes for Letters, Drama and Music". The New York Times.
 "Los Angeles Times and Wall Street Journal Each Win Two Pulitzer Prizes". The New York Times.

Pulitzer Prizes by year
Pulitzer Prize
Pulitzer Prize
Pulitzer Prize, 2005